Artie Levine (January 26, 1925 – January 13, 2012) was an American boxer in the middleweight and light heavyweight divisions in the 1940s during which time he gained top ten ratings in both weight classes. Between May, 1946 and April, 1949 Levine was ranked by The Ring magazine as high as the #6 Middleweight in the world.

Overview

Levine, who was Jewish and from Brooklyn, was a legitimate contender who flattened 36 opponents with his devastating left hook.

At 5' 8", he was a right handed slugger, with an orthodox fighting style. His left hook made him a fighter who no one looked forward to facing in the ring.  He was trained by Charley Goldman, the fabled trainer of boxing legend Rocky Marciano.

From 1941–42, Levine fought twenty-seven times with only two losses, and won by knockout an impressive seventeen times.

Levine vs. Robinson 
On November 6, 1946, Levine challenged Sugar Ray Robinson at the Arena in Cleveland, Ohio. Barely able to rise from a nine count in the fifth, Robinson later claimed Levine hit him with the hardest punch of his career, a powerful left hook to the jaw.  The referee held up the fight after Robinson was down, and walked Levine to his corner, and then resumed the count, giving Robinson as much as seventeen seconds to recover, an act which may have prevented Levine from immediately following up and ending the fight.  After clinching for the remainder of the round to recover, Robinson came back and knocked out Levine in the tenth round after a paralyzing blow to the solar plexus allowed him to follow up with rapid blows to the head and body that put Levine down for the full count.  It was the first time Levine had been knocked out in 60 fights, and nearly the only knockdown and almost the only real knockout loss in Robinson's impressive career (Robinson was later defeated by technical knockout by Joey Maxim, but only after suffering from exhaustion in the Maxim contest).

On March 11, 1946, Levine matched skills with Jimmy Doyle in Cleveland, Ohio, defeating him in a ninth round knock out.  Levine later told a reporter that Doyle nearly died in the ring as the result of the blows he received and required a respirator to stay alive.  Doyle died a year later in a fight with Sugar Ray Robinson.  Levine claimed the experience affected his aggressiveness in the ring, and reduced his desire to stay with boxing as a career.

In March 1947, Levine met Herbie Kronowitz of Brooklyn winning a ten-round unanimous decision in the main event at Madison Square Garden in New York City. The crowd of 12,000 was said to have been enthralled during the entire battle between the two fighters. Kronowitz always claimed that he really defeated Levine in the confrontation.

Experiencing a decline, he lost to Billy Fox at Madison Square Garden in a third-round technical knockout on June 27, 1947.  Fox had been nearly knocked out in the second round, but came back to send Levine to the mat in the third before the referee ended the bout.

Life after boxing
After losses to Chuck Hunter and Dick Wagner, Levine retired in 1949 at only 24, feeling disillusioned and disgusted by the criminal element he felt had taken over his career.  Using his ambition and intellect, he owned a meat business, started a local teamsters union and became a successful sales manager at Volkswagen, one of America's largest car dealerships.  He died on January 13, 2012, at the age of 86 in Matthews, North Carolina, and was buried at Woodlawn Cemetery.

Professional boxing record
All information in this section is derived from BoxRec, unless otherwise stated.

Official record

All newspaper decisions are officially regarded as “no decision” bouts and are not counted in the win/loss/draw column.

Unofficial record

Record with the inclusion of newspaper decisions in the win/loss/draw column.

See also
List of select Jewish boxers

References

External links
 
 Additional Information
 When Boxing was a Jewish Sport synopsys

Jewish boxers
Jewish American boxers
Boxers from Cleveland
Middleweight boxers
Light-heavyweight boxers
1925 births
2012 deaths
American male boxers
21st-century American Jews